This is a list of people elected Fellow of the Royal Society in 1924.

Fellows 

Henry Balfour
Joseph Edwin Barnard
James Fairlie Gemmill
Mervyn Henry Gordon
Percy Groom
Sir Christopher Kelk Ingold
Percy Fry Kendall
Louis Vessot King
Louis Joel Mordell
Thomas Slater Price
Sir Chandrasekhara Venkata Raman
Leonard James Rogers
Alexander Russell
Charles Edward Spearman
Frank Twyman

Statute 12 

Sir Otto John Beit
David Alexander Edward Lindsay, 27th Earl of Crawford and 10th Earl of Balcarres

1924
1924 in the United Kingdom
1924 in science